Lake Llamacocha (possibly from Quechua llama llama, qucha lake) is a lake in the Andes of  Peru. It is located in the Ancash Region, Corongo Province, Cusca District.

References 

Lakes of Peru
Lakes of Ancash Region